The Ritzville Historic District, located in Ritzville, Washington, is a district listed on the National Register of Historic Places. The district encompasses 3 blocks of Ritzville's main business district and contains 27 contributing and 11 noncontributing properties.

Contributing Properties 
The historical district contains a total of 27 contributing properties, built between 1889 and 1935:
 The Ritzville Carnegie Library, also known as Ritzville Public Library, at 302 West Main Avenue, built 1907.
 The Ritzville Hotel, 220 West Main Avenue, built 1910.
 The George H. Lemman Building, also known as the B&J Restaurant, 214 West Main Avenue, built c. 1905.
 The F.G. Spanjer Building, 208 West Main Avenue, built 1898.
 The Ritzville Trading Company Buildings block, at 202 West Main Avenue, 201 and 203 West Broadway Avenue, built 1898.
 The H.E. Gritman Building, at corner of  West Main Avenue and North Washington Street, built 1902.
 The William Snyder Building, at 116 West Main Avenue, built 1899.
 The O.R. Haight Building, at 114 West Main Avenue, built 1901.
 The A&C Bakery building, at 102 and 104 West Main Avenue, built 1910.
 The Pioneer State Bank, now U.S. Bank, at 101 East Main Avenue, built 1901.
 The Ritz Theater, at 107 East Main Avenue, built c. 1935.
 The Hanson Flower's building, at 105 West Main Avenue, built c. 1905.
 The Burt's Hardware building, at 107 West Main Avenue, built c. 1905.
 The Sears building, at 109 and 111 West Main Avenue, built between 1910 and 1920.
 The N.H. Greene Building, at 119 West Main Avenue, built 1889.
 The German American Bank, now Columbia Bank, at 201 West Main Avenue, built 1904.
 The Orris Dorman Building, at 203 and 205 West Main Avenue, built 1904.
 The A.F. Rosenoff Building, at 207 West Main Avenue, built 1901.
 The Myers Dry Goods Store Building, at 209 and 211 West Main Avenue, built c. 1901–1904.
 The building at 213 West Main Avenue, built c. 1901–1904.
 The Adams County Bank Building, at 301 West Main Avenue, built 1892.
 The Kalkwarf Motor Company Building, 101 to 107 North Adams Street, built 1910.
 The E.D. Gilson Building, at 218 West Railroad Avenue, built 1904.
 The Journal Building, at 214 and 216 West Railroad Avenue, built c. 1910–1920.
 The Kalkwarf Hardware Store, at 210 West Railroad Avenue, built c. 1910–1920.
 The Northern Pacific Railway Depot, now hosting the Railroad Depot Museum, at 201 West Railroad Avenue, built 1909–1910.

See also
 National Register of Historic Places listings in Washington

References

Historic districts on the National Register of Historic Places in Washington (state)
National Register of Historic Places in Adams County, Washington